Raghagan Dam is a concrete gravity dam under construction 13 kilometers East of Khaar town, Bajaur District of FATA, Pakistan.

Construction of the dam started in January 2013 and is expected to be completed by June 2021, with a projected cost of PKR 483.586 million.
The dam has a height of 52 feet and a length of 200 feet. The dam will irrigate an area of around 3,500 acres land, with total water storage capacity of 1,252 acre-feet.

Incident

See also
 List of dams and reservoirs in Pakistan

References

Dams in Pakistan
Buildings and structures in Khyber Pakhtunkhwa
Gravity dams
Dams in Khyber Pakhtunkhwa